Judith Peixotto Sulzberger (December 27, 1923 – February 21, 2011) was an American physician and philanthropist. Her family has been associated with The New York Times since her grandfather, Adolph Ochs purchased the paper in 1896.

Early life and childhood
Sulzberger was one of four children of Iphigene Sulzberger (née Ochs) (1892–1990) and Arthur Hays Sulzberger (1891–1968), the publisher of The New York Times from 1935-61.

Her brother, Arthur Ochs "Punch" Sulzberger served as publisher of The New York Times and chairman and CEO of the Times Company; her sister Marian Sulzberger Heiskell was a philanthropist; and her other sister, Ruth Sulzberger Holmberg was a publisher.

Education
She graduated from Smith College in 1946, and from the Columbia University College of Physicians and Surgeons in 1949.
She spent 2 years interning  pathology at Grasslands Hospital of Valhalla, New York but never completed her residency

Career
She was a director of The New York Times from 1974 to 2000.
She authored a book Younger (2003).
In the early 1990s, she provided financing for what became the J. P. Sulzberger Genome Center at Columbia's College of Physicians and Surgeons, her alma mater.

Personal life 
She was married four times. She had two sons from her first marriage to Matthew Rosenschein Jr. : Daniel Hays Cohen (né Rosenschein) (1952-2016) and James Matthew "Jace" Cohen (né Rosenschein). Her sons were later adopted by her second husband Richard N. Cohen and they took his last name. Judith and her third husband Budd Levinson divorced in 1984, but later remarried.

Death
She died at age 87 from pancreatic cancer in her native New York City. She was survived by, among others, her third husband, Budd Levinson, and her two sons, Daniel Hays Cohen (died 2016) and James Matthew Cohen (from her first marriage), as well as a stepdaughter, two stepsons, four grandchildren, and several step-grandchildren.

References

1923 births
2011 deaths
20th-century American women scientists
20th-century American scientists
American pathologists
American people of Czech-Jewish descent
American people of German-Jewish descent
Columbia University faculty
Columbia University Vagelos College of Physicians and Surgeons alumni
Deaths from cancer in New York (state)
Deaths from pancreatic cancer
Jewish American scientists
Physicians from New York (state)
Smith College alumni
Sulzberger family
Women pathologists
American women academics
21st-century American Jews
21st-century American women